Harold Zisla (June 28, 1925 – March 18, 2016) was an American abstract expressionist painter and art educator. In 1968 he became the founding chair of the Fine Arts Department at Indiana University South Bend, where he taught until his retirement in 1989.

Early life
Zisla was born in Cleveland, Ohio. During his youth he took art classes at the Cleveland Museum of Art (1932-1937), and he studied with painter Paul B. Travis at Council Educational Alliance (1938–40). In 1940 he won a scholarship to Young Artist Classes at the Cleveland Museum of Art, where he took classes with Milton S. Fox, a painter and art historian who later served as editor-in-chief and vice president of Harry N. Abrams Inc., an art book publisher.

Zisla earned his high school diploma from East Technical High School in Cleveland in 1943. Following high school, he served in the United States Navy until 1946. He graduated from the Cleveland School of Art with a diploma in painting in 1950. The same year, he received his B.S. in art education at Western Reserve University. The following year he earned his M.S. in art education. He moved to South Bend, Indiana, in 1952, where he worked first as an industrial designer at Uniroyal.

Career
He directed the South Bend Art Center (now the South Bend Museum of Art) from 1957 to 1966, prior to accepting the professorship at what was then called the South Bend-Mishawaka Campus of Indiana University. Four-year degree programs had just been authorized in 1965, and Zisla had the responsibility of hiring new faculty.

Zisla was long active in service to community arts in the Michiana region. Following his tenure as executive director, he served on the South Bend Art Center board of trustees. He also served on the acquisitions committee of Purdue University, the Advisory Board of the Gallery at Saint Mary’s College, and the Mayor’s Committee to Build a Cultural Complex.

Zisla said about painting that it "should be, more than anything else, a liberation into the spirit of the artist, and to have presence, impact, dynamism, freedom from the trite, the contrived, the boringly dead." Paintings, he said, "must be alive.”

Harold Zisla married Doreen on August 13, 1946. They have two children, Paul Zisla and Beverly Welber.

The Harold and Doreen Zisla Art Scholarship has been established at Indiana University South Bend to support graduate and undergraduate students whose work displays an interest in experimental art.

Selected solo exhibits
 1965 Indiana University South Bend (IUSB)
 1968 South Bend Museum of Art (SBMA)
 1969 Niles Art Center, Niles, Michigan
 1979 In Celebration, SBMA
 1980 Retrospective Images: Icons and Indices, Saint Anselm College, Manchester, New Hampshire
 1981 Faces, Figures, Flowers: An Exhibition of Paintings and Drawings, IUSB
 1982 Harold Zisla: Recent Works, Midwest Museum of American Art, Elkhart, Indiana
 1985 Accumulations: Harold Zisla Retrospective, SBMA
 1990 Either/Or: New Works, SBMA
 1991 Simplicity Complexity = Complexity Simplicity, IUSB
 1995 Paintings and Drawings, Lakeside Gallery, Lakeside, Michigan
 1996 Harold Zisla: Recent Paintings, SBMA
 1998 Portraits, etc., IUSB
 2000 Newest Works: Summations, SBMA
 2005 Celebration: Harold Zisla, Blue Gallery, Three Oaks, Michigan
 2008 Fertile Densities, IUSB
 2009 Zisla: Paintings and Works on Paper, New Galleries, South Bend
 2013 Gestural Images Deepened, Buchanan Art Center, Buchanan, Michigan

Selected group exhibitions
 1948 The May Show, Cleveland Museum of Art
 1959 Regional Art Exhibition, Kalamazoo Institute of Arts, Kalamazoo, Michigan
 1960 Indiana Art Exhibition, John Herron Art Institute, Indianapolis, Indiana
 1967 Talbot Gallery, Indianapolis
 1969 London Graphica Gallery, Petoskey, Michigan
 1973 Artist and Model: Three Views, SBMA
 1976 St. Joseph Art Association, St. Joseph, Michigan
 1980 Indiana State Museum, Indianapolis
 1980-81 Four Figurative Artists, University Art Galleries, Valparaiso University, Valparaiso, Indiana; Krasl Art Center, St. Joseph, Michigan; SBMA; Lafayette Art Center, Lafayette, Indiana; Anderson Fine Arts Center, Anderson, Indiana
 1984 The Act of Drawing: An Exhibition of Contemporary Drawings, SBMA
 1987 Choices: Twenty Painters from the Midwest, Minneapolis College of Art and Design, Minneapolis, Minnesota
 2000 Fall Promega Art Showcase, BioPharmaceutical Technology Center, Madison, Wisconsin

Books
 Provocative Lines: Drawings by Harold Zisla (2020)
 Fine Arts of the South Bend Region, 1840-2000, Walter R. Collins, editor (Wolfson Press 2014)

Awards
 1985 First Eldon Lundquist Faculty Fellow, Indiana University South Bend, the highest faculty award at the South Bend campus
 1985 Sagamore of the Wabash (Conferred by the Governor of Indiana Robert D. Orr. This award is the highest distinction in the state. Indiana’s Native American tribes used the term to indicate a “lesser chief or a great man among the tribe whom the chief consulted for wisdom and advice.” The award states that the recipient is “distinguished by his Humanity in Living, his Loyalty in Friendship, his Wisdom in Council, and his Inspiration in Leadership.”)
 1990 South Bend Alumni Association’s Community Hall of Fame
 1997 South Bend Mayor’s Arts Award (For cultural contributions to the community)

References

External links
 Zisla's Facebook page
 Zisla's home page
 Video: Zisla discusses his aesthetic of abstraction

1925 births
2016 deaths
Abstract expressionist artists
Abstract painters
American abstract artists
20th-century American painters
20th-century American male artists
American male painters
Artists from Cleveland
Painters from Ohio
Case Western Reserve University alumni
Cleveland Institute of Art alumni
People from Cleveland
Indiana University faculty
People from South Bend, Indiana
Jewish American artists
21st-century American Jews